Pervis Ferris Young (24 March 1928 - 29 May 2003) was magistrate of the British Overseas Territory of Pitcairn Island from 1967 until 1975. Young was born on Pitcairn Island and died in 2003 at Auckland. He was succeeded by his brother-in-law Ivan Christian, and was uncle to future mayors Steve Christian and Brenda Christian.

Ancestry

References

1928 births
Pitcairn Islands politicians
2003 deaths
Pitcairn Islands people of Saint Kitts and Nevis descent
Pitcairn Islands people of English descent
Pitcairn Islands people of Manx descent
Pitcairn Islands people of Polynesian descent
Pitcairn Islands people of Scottish descent
Pitcairn Islands people of Cornish descent
Pitcairn Islands people of American descent